White Elephant is an American action film directed by Jesse V. Johnson and written by Johnson and Erik Martinez, based on a story by Johnson. It stars Michael Rooker, Bruce Willis, Olga Kurylenko, and John Malkovich.

It was released in the United States by RLJE Films and AMC+ on June 3, 2022.

Premise
Gabriel Tancredi, a former Marine turned mob enforcer, breaks his code of conduct to save a police officer, Vanessa, who witnessed a failed assassination attempt ordered by Arnold Solomon, his friend and ruthless mob boss.

Cast
 Michael Rooker as Gabriel Tancredi
 Bruce Willis as Arnold Solomon
 Olga Kurylenko as Vanessa Flynn
 John Malkovich as Glen Follett
 Vadhir Derbez as Carlos Garcia
 Josef Cannon as Jim
 Lauren Buglioli as Tomi
 Lorenzo Antonucci as K.I.M
 Louie Ski Carr as Luis Velasquez
 Michael Rose as Walter Koschek
 Chris Cleveland as Daley

Production
The film was shot in the state of Georgia, beginning in April 2021. White Elephant is one of the last films to star Bruce Willis, who retired from acting because he was diagnosed with frontotemporal dementia. Director Jesse V. Johnson, who previously worked with Willis when he himself was a stuntman, told the Los Angeles Times that "it was clear that he was not the Bruce I remembered". Willis's lines were filmed at a quicker pace at the suggestion of his assistant, Stephen J. Eads. Several crew members recalled Willis appearing confused on set. One of the crew members said, "It was less of an annoyance and more like: 'How do we not make Bruce look bad?'. Someone would give him a line and he didn't understand what it meant. He was just being puppeted." Production supervisor Terri Martin said, "He just looked so lost, and he would say, 'I'll do my best.' He always tried his best." Johnson would later be asked if he wanted to film another movie with Willis but the director declined the offer, stating, "it was decided as a team that we would not do another. We are all Bruce Willis fans, and the arrangement felt wrong and ultimately a rather sad end to an incredible career, one that none of us felt comfortable with."

Release
The film was released in select theaters in the United States by RLJE Films and on streaming on AMC+ on June 3, 2022.

Box office
As of November 17, 2022, White Elephant grossed $37,317 in the United Arab Emirates and Russia.

Critical response

Roger Moore of Movie Nation gave a negative review and wrote, "judging from the inane script, the unhurried direction...and by the destruction wrought when machine guns tear up cars, houses and people (nothing graphic enough to be honest), it's obvious that the budget here went to actors and ordinance." Dom Sinacola of Paste also gave a negative review, summarizing the film was "like the work of an artist still searching for inspiration."

Tae Kwon Do Life Magazine praised Michael Rooker's performance in the film, "This is his best performance, by far.   He is very memorable in this role."

References

External links
 
 

2022 action thriller films
2022 films
2022 independent films
American action films
Films set in Georgia (U.S. state)
Films shot in Georgia (U.S. state)
RLJE Films
2020s English-language films
Films directed by Jesse V. Johnson
2020s American films